Tical 0: The Prequel is the third studio album by American rapper Method Man. The album was released on May 18, 2004, by Def Jam Recordings. The album features production from Sean "Puffy" Combs, Rockwilder, and Mr. Porter, among others, as well as guest appearances including Redman, Missy Elliott, Snoop Dogg, Ludacris, and various other Wu-Tang affiliates. Method Man would later voice his displeasure with the album, stating "On the third LP, it was suggested to bring in Harve Pierre and P Diddy. Who am I to argue? Puff knows how to sell some records. But that wasn't the direction to go in, and I know that now."

Upon its release, Tical 0: The Prequel debuted at number two on the Billboard 200 chart, and was certified gold by the RIAA on July 14, 2004. The album received mostly mixed reviews from critics who criticized its lack of cohesiveness, production, and overall sound.

Critical reception

Tical 0: The Prequel garnered mixed reviews from music critics who felt it lacked cohesiveness in its production and Meth's lyricism. At Metacritic, which assigns a normalized rating out of 100 to reviews from mainstream critics, the album received an average score of 51, based on 13 reviews.

Chris Ryan from Spin gave praise to Meth's signature hook-filled delivery being utilized well on the various "tried-and-true rap templates" throughout the track listing, highlighting his Wu-Tang features with RZA and Ghostface Killah. Vibe writer Damien Lemon found Meth's usual brand of lyrical bars to be of diminished quality and that the only things keeping the record together are the quality beats from Rick Rock, P. Diddy and Dofat, and the collaborations with Ghostface Killah ("Afterparty") and Busta Rhymes ("What's Hapennin'"). AllMusic's Andy Kellman saw the album as having even lower interest to attract listeners than the similar but more ambitious Tical 2000, criticizing the overabundance of guest artists and producers for making the listening experience feel "unfocused and disjointed, not diverse and well-rounded" despite commending Meth for retaining his charismatic personality and strong lyricism, concluding that "[A]s an MC, he's had nothing to prove for quite some time. Give or take a couple hot tracks, this release is not likely to play a significant role in his legacy." Rolling Stones Peter Relic felt the record lacked the "astro-black ambition" that encapsulated previous Tical installments and found Meth's stoner persona devolved into a "leering grotesque of his former menacing self", saying "Tical 0 finds the thirty-three-year-old still stuck spinning doughnuts in a cul-de-sac of blunts." Scott McKeating of Stylus Magazine was heavily critical towards the album, noting the "scattered production styles" and featured guests making Meth's performance feel lacklustre, and the overall concept lacking focus due to studio interference concluding that, "There’s probably an OK Tical 0 that you could Frankenstein together from the leftovers and leaks, but he wasn’t anywhere near interested or prepared to make this album; it’s a bloody mess."

Track listing
Credits adapted from the album's liner notes.

Notes
 signifies a co-producer

Sample credits
 "Say What" contains interpolations of "Come Clean", written by Chris Martin, Kendrick Davis, Fred Scruggs, Tyrone Taylor, Kirk Jones, and Shelly Manne. It also contains a sample from "Patiently", written by James Baker, Lotte Wiggins, and Melvin Wilson, as performed by New Birth.
 "What's Happenin'" contains a sample of "Dum Maro Dum", written by Anand Bakshi and R. D. Burman, as performed by Asha Bhosle.
 "The Turn" contains a sample from "Where Are You Going To My Love?", written by William Davidson, Michael Davies, John Goodison, and Anthony Hiller, as performed by The Miracles.
 "Tease" contains a sample from "Cause I Love You", written by Lenny Williams and Michael Bennett, as performed by Lenny Williams.
 "Rodeo" contains a sample from "If I'm In Luck I Might Get Picked Up", written by Betty Mabry, as performed by Betty Davis.
 "The Show" contains a sample of "Nothing At All", written by Martin Deller, Cameron Hawkins, and Ben Mink, as performed by FM.
 "Afterparty" contains a sample of "I Just Don't Know About This Girl", written by Cleveland Horne, Joseph Pruitt, and Abrim Tilmon, as performed by The Detroit Emeralds.

Personnel
Credits for Tical 0: The Prequel adapted from AllMusic.

 Method Man – executive producer
Kevin Liles – executive producer
 Harve Pierre – A&R direction
 Tina M. Davis – A&R
Mark Brown – A&R
Folayan Knight – A&R
Tyson Davis – A&R coordinator
Patrick "Plain Pat" Reynolds – A&R administrator
 Tony Vanias – recording administrator
Chris Athens – mastering
 Shante Bacon – marketing
 James Ellis – management
  Dawud S. West – art direction, design and graffiti
 James Porto – cover illustration
  Vurv Inc. – phoenix logo
 Matt Doyle – photography
 Walik Goshorn – bus photo
Jennifer L. Justice – legal counsel
 Randy "Mac" McMillan – business affairs
Antoinette Trotman – business affairs
Ian Allen – business affairs
Chris Kellam – engineer
Deborah Mannis-Gardner – sample clearance agent

Charts and certifications

Weekly charts

Certifications

Year-end charts

See also
 List of Billboard number-one R&B albums of 2004

References

2004 albums
Method Man albums
Sequel albums
Albums produced by DJ Scratch
Albums produced by Rick Rock
Albums produced by Mr. Porter
Albums produced by RZA
Albums produced by Scott Storch
Albums produced by No I.D.
Albums produced by Rockwilder
Albums produced by Sean Combs